GKM Grudziądz is a Polish motorcycle speedway team based in Grudziądz. They race at the 8,000-capacity Stadion Żużlowy w Grudziądzu. The team currently competes in the Ekstraliga (the highest division) and have won the bronze medal in the Team Speedway Polish Championship once.

History

1948 to 1950
The club competed in the inaugural 1948 Polish speedway season, under the name of Olimpia Grudziądz and won the bronze medal. The Olimpia motorcycle club had been established in 1924. In 1949, they competed as Olimpia-Unia Grudziądz and in 1950 as Unia Grudziądz. The 1950 season would be the last season for the team for nearly three decades.

1977 to 1994 
Speedway returned to Grudziądz during the 1977 Polish speedway season with a team called GSŻ Grudziądz that entered the Second division. The team was consisted mainly of riders from Stal KS Toruń that had failed to make the Torun first team. In 1980, the team was renamed to GKM Grudziądz. For 18 years the team remained in the second division starved of any success.

1995 to 2001 
The club finally experienced the first league in 1996 after gaining promotion in 1995 but unfortunately suffered immediate relegation despite the signing of Billy Hamill, who would become the world champion the same year. However, the team were performing much better than in previous years and won their first honour by winning the second division in 1997; Hamill spearheaded the team and was supported by Hungarian Zoltán Adorján.

Following the creation of the Ekstraliga in 2000 and the reorganisation of the leagues, Grudziądz found themselves in the Polish 1.Liga and at the end of the 2001 season the club was liquidated.

2002 to 2012 
In 2002, speedway quickly returned with a team called GTŻ Grudziądz but the team were relegated to 2.Liga. However, they began their recovery by winning 2.Liga on 2003. In 2012, the club won a bronze medal in the Polish Pairs Speedway Championship.

2013 to present 
In 2013, the club was renamed GKM Grudziądz SA. In 2015 and 2016, they competed in the Ekstraliga by default (due to the financial misfortune of other clubs) and have remained in the top division since (as of 2023). Przemysław Pawlicki and Krzysztof Kasprzak won the Pairs championship in 2021.

Teams

2023 team
  Nicki Pedersen
  Max Fricke
 / Gleb Chugunov
  Frederik Jakobsen
  Kacper Pludra
  Mateusz Szczepaniak 
  Norbert Krakowiak
  Kacper Lobdzinski
  Seweryn Orgacki
  Wiktor Rafalski
 / Vadim Tarasenko

Previous teams

2022 team

  Krzysztof Kasprzak
  Seweryn Orgacki
  Frederik Jakobsen
  Przemysław Pawlicki
  Kacper Pludra
  Wiktor Rafalski
  Norbert Krakowiak
  Nicki Pedersen

Notable riders

Honours

References 

Grudziadz
Sport in Grudziądz